Tikhoretsk is an airbase of the Russian Air Force located near Tikhoretsk, Krasnodar Krai, Russia.

The base is home to the 627th Training Aviation Regiment with the Aero L-39C Albatros as part of the Krasnodar Higher Military Aviation School of Pilots.

References

Russian Air Force bases